Maja Trochimczyk (born Maria Anna Trochimczyk; 30 December 1957 in Warsaw, Poland, other name: Maria Anna Harley) is an American music historian, writer and poet of Polish descent. She published six poetry books: Rose Always – A Love Story, 2017;  Miriam's Iris, or Angels in the Garden, 2008; Slicing the Bread: Children's Survival Manual in 25 Poems (Finishing Line Press, 2014); Into Light: Poems and Incantations; The Rainy Bread – Poems from Exile,, 2016; an anthology Chopin with Cherries, 2010), and a multi-faith anthology Meditations on Divine Names.

Career
Her poems and photographs appear in numerous journals and anthologies, including: Clockwise Cat, "Ekphrasis, Epiphany Magazine,", the Lily Review, Loch Raven Review, Magnapoets, Quill and Parchment, Phantom Seed, poeticdiversity, Sage Trail, San Gabriel Valley Poetry Quarterly, The Original Van Gogh's Ear Anthology, Poetry Super Highway, The Scream Online, The Houston Literary Review, and other venues. She may be heard discussing her poetry on KPFK's Poets' Cafe, interviewed by Lois P. Jones in 2011. Video recordings of Trochimczyk's poetry are found on YouTube channel of Moonrise Press and Poetry LA.

As a music historian, she published six books of music studies and essays: After Chopin: Essays in Polish Music (USC, 2000); The Music of Louis Andriessen  (Routledge, 2002) including interviews with the composer and analyses of his music; Polish Dance in California (Columbia UP, East European Monographs, 2007); A Romantic Century in Polish Music,; Frédéric Chopin: A Research and Information Guide. Co-edited with William Smialek in the series Routledge Music Bibliographies (New York: Routledge, 2015). and Lutoslawski: Music and Legacy a collection of essays about Witold Lutoslawski, co-edited with Stanislaw Latek and published jointly by Polish Institute of Arts and Sciences in Canada (Montreal) and the Polska Akademia Umiejetnosci (Krakow, Poland) in 2014., 

In 2001, she created a site on Polish folk dance at the USC Polish Music Center, with entries about various Polish dance types and folk dance groups active in California. An article in the Cosmopolitan Review shows the unwitting dependence of folk dance movement in America on Stalinist aesthetics and ideology.

Trochimczyk wrote 18 book chapters and 27 peer-reviewed articles on music and culture, listed on her website with publication details, publications before 2000 appeared under the name of Maria Anna Harley. Her study of Gorecki's ideas of motherhood and his Third Symphony was published in The Musical Quarterly in 1998 and reprinted in a special issue of the Polish Music Journal dedicated to Gorecki in 2003. Her work on spatial music and its composers, such as Henry Brant or Iannis Xenakis, appeared in: American Music, Computer Music Journal, The PDF of her doctoral dissertation, "Space and Spatialization in Contemporary Music: History and Analysis, Ideas and Implementations" (McGill University, 1994), is available from Moonrise Press. An article on Grazyna Bacewicz and Picasso was issued by the Journal of Musicological Research.. Trochimczyk's work on Bartok's concept of nature and his birdsong portrayals appeared in Studia Musicologica and Tempo.  Zbigniew Skowron's book Lutoslawski Studies included her chapter on Witold Lutoslawski's musical symbols of death, while Halina Goldberg's The Age of Chopin featured a study of extreme nationalism in the reception of Chopin, associated with the concept of the "Polish race.". A presenter at the Second and Third International Chopin Congresses in Warsaw, Poland (in 1999 and 2010 respectively), she published articles in their proceedings.,. She maintains a popular Chopin blog, Chopin with Cherries. Trochimczyk also wrote about Chopin reception by women composers in the Polish Review (2000), and by poets in the Polish-American Studies. The latter journal issued her study of the image of Paderewski, explored earlier in the Polish Music Journal. A recent research interest is the immigration of Polish composers to America, discussed in a chapter in Anna Mazurkiewicz's East Central Europe in Exile, vol. 1, and in Polin, vol. 19, Polish-Jewish Relations in North America. She also edited the proceedings of the first conference on Polish Jewish Music held in 1998 at USC for the Polish Music Journal. Eva Mantzouriani's Polish Music after 1945 included Trochimczyk's chapter on the events of 1968.

Recognition
A recipient of fellowships/awards from McGill University, Social Sciences and Humanities Research Council of Canada, University of Southern California, Polish American Historical Association, and American Council of Learned Societies, Dr. Trochimczyk served as poet laureate of Sunland-Tujunga, Los Angeles in 2010–2012, and as the President of the Helena Modjeska Arts and Culture Club in Los Angeles in 2010–2012. For the Club, she organized over 30 events (lectures, concerts, film screenings, and receptions) during her tenure, documented on the blog, modjeskaclub.blogspot.com. Among other activities, she presented the Modjeska Prizes to eminent Polish actors, Jan Nowicki, Barbara Krafftowna, and Anna Dymna. As the Poet Laureate of Sunland-Tujunga, she wrote a monthly column for a community paper, The Voice of the Village. She continued poetic activities in the local community as member of the Planning Committee of the Village Poets of Sunland-Tujunga, as well as the owner of the Moonrise Press. Simultaneously, she has held the position of an officer and newsletter editor of the Polish American Historical Association since 2009,. In 2011 she became a member of the editorial board of the Ecomusicology Newsletter of the Ecomusicology Study Group of the American Musicological Society.

In 2012, Trochimczyk received a medal from the Ministry of Culture and the Arts of Poland for the promotion of Polish culture. Her volunteering has also been recognized by the City and County of Los Angeles. In 2013, she was nominated to serve as Chair of Culture Committee in the Polonia Advisory Board for the Consulate General of the Republic of Poland in Los Angeles. In 2015, she received the Distinguished Service Award from the Polish American Historical Association and in 2016 the Creative Arts Prize from the same organization for her poetry volumes about Polish civilian experience in WWII and its aftermath, Slicing the Bread and The Rainy Bread.

Books 
Into Light: Poems and Incantations. Collection of spiritual poems and meditations. (Los Angeles: Moonrise Press, 2016).  Color paperback. .
Frédéric Chopin: A Research and Information Guide. Co-edited with William Smialek. Series Routledge Music Bibliographies (New York: Routledge, 2015). .
The Rainy Bread - Poems from Exile. (Los Angeles: Moonrise Press, 2016). Poetry Collection – poems about Polish experience during WWII and its aftermath, especially civilian deportations to Siberia, life under Soviet and German occupation, and exile.  – Paperback.  – Ebook.
Slicing the Bread. (Finishing Line Press, 2014). 
Meditations on Divine Names. Poetry anthology (Los Angeles: Moonrise Press, 2012). .
Chopin with Cherries: A Tribute in Verse. Poetry anthology (Los Angeles: Moonrise Press, 2010). .
A Romantic Century in Polish Music. Edited volume of music studies. (Los Angeles: Moonrise Press, 2009).  (paperback).
Rose Always – A Love Story. Poetry collection. (Los Angeles: Moonrise Press, 2017). Color paperback with rose photographs  .
Miriam's Iris, or Angels in the Garden. Poetry collection. (Los Angeles: Moonrise Press, 2008).  (with color photographs),  (paperback).
Polish Dance in Southern California. In East European Monographs series. (New York: Columbia University Press, 2007). .
The Music of Louis Andriessen. Edited volume of music studies and interviews. (New York and London: Routledge, 2002). .
After Chopin: Essays in Polish Music. Edited volume of music studies and translations. (Los Angeles: Polish Music Center at USC, 2000). .

References

Further reading 
Bloch, Gregory W. "The Problem with Andriessen." Echo VI/2. 2004.
Dutka, Elaine. "How USC Nabbed the Great Górecki," Los Angeles Times, 1 October 1997.
Guzlowski, John Z. Review of Chopin with Cherries: A Tribute in Verse in The Cosmopolitan Review 2 no. 1 (Spring 2010).
Harsh, Ed. Review of The Music of Louis Andriessen (2002), in Notes, Music Library Association Quarterly, 60, no. 1 (September 2003): 160–162.
Inglis, Jadwiga. "Kompozytorka Joanna Bruzdowicz w Los Angeles," The Summit Times (January 2004), Wirtualna Polonia (January 2004).
Inglis, Jadwiga. "Pięc tysięcy stron o muzyce. Rozmowa z Mają Trochimczyk," [Five thousand pages about music. An interview with Maja Trochimczyk]. Interview in Polish, in News of Polonia (March 2004), The Summit Times (February 2004), and Głos/Voice (April 2004), reprinted in Bialy Orzel/White Eagle (May 2007).
Kanski, Elizabeth.  "A Tribute to Chopin in Verse," review of Chopin with Cherries: A Tribute in Verse in Polish American Journal, September 2010, p. 21.
Makowski, Jenna. Review of Polish Dance in Southern California in Journal of Folklore Research, November 2008.
Thomas, G. Murray. Review of Miriam's Iris, or Angels in the Garden in Poetix.net, February 2010.
Woods, Christopher. Review of Chopin with Cherries: A Tribute in Verse in Contemporary World Literature, February 2011
Reklewska-Braun, Zofia, review of "Slicing the Bread" Poetry Chapbook (Georgetown, KY: Finishing Line Press, 2014), in Goniec, March 2015
Boss, Sally, review of "Slicing the Bread" Poetry Chapbook (Finishing Line Press, 2014), in the Sarmatian Review, April 2015, p. 1931–1932.
Strybel, Robert, review of "Slicing the Bread" Poetry Chapbook (Finishing Line Press, 2014), in the Polish American Journal, January 2015.
Kozaczka, Grazyna, review of "Chopin with Cherries" and "Meditations on Divine Names" anthologies in The Polish Review, vol. 58, no. 4 (2013): 108–110.

1957 births
Living people
American music historians
University of Warsaw alumni
McGill University School of Music alumni
American women historians
Writers from Warsaw
Writers from Los Angeles
Polish emigrants to the United States
American women poets
Women writers about music
Historians of Polish Americans
Historians from California
21st-century American women